The 1875 Pennsylvania gubernatorial election occurred on November 2, 1875. Incumbent governor John F. Hartranft, a Republican, was a candidate for re-election. Hartranft defeated Democratic candidate Cyrus L. Pershing to win another term.

Results

References

1875
Pennsylvania
Gubernatorial
November 1875 events